Ádám Kozák (born 15 June 2002) is a Hungarian chess grandmaster.

Chess career
In 2019 in Tallinn, he won the U-18 European Rapid Chess Championship and the U-18 Blitz Championship. He was awarded the grandmaster title in 2020, becoming the youngest Hungarian to earn the title.

He was one of the 36 European players from the European Hybrid Qualification Chess Tournament to qualify for the Chess World Cup 2021.

References

External links

Ádám Kozák chess games at 365Chess.com

2002 births
Living people
Chess grandmasters
Hungarian chess players